Shuotherium is a fossil mammal known from Middle-Late Jurassic of the Forest Marble Formation of England, and the Shaximiao Formation of Sichuan, China.

The original holotype is composed of a partial dentary and seven teeth (two which are incomplete).  The holotypes for other species of this genus are solely represented by isolated molars.  Shuotherium, along with Pseudotribos has been placed in the family Shuotheriidae as a sister taxon of the Australosphenida (see, Yinotheria), making it a relative of modern monotremes. However, some studies place it and other shuothereres as closer to therian mammals.

Description
In the lower molars, the talonid is situated in front of the trigonid, such a unique dental form is distinct from the typical tribosphenic pattern.  In this "pseudotribosphenic" trait, the mesial cingulid is expanded to form a pseudotalonid, and its distal talonid is underdeveloped.  It shares with Australosphenida a thin, slender lower jaw but differs from the non-monotreme Ausktribosphenida by having more developed postdentary trough.  Its dental formula has been reconstructed as: p4, m3 (four premolars, three molars).

 had this to say regarding the fossil:

Notes

References

 
 
 
 
 
 

Jurassic mammals of Europe
Jurassic mammals of Asia
Prehistoric mammal genera
Fossil taxa described in 1982
Taxa named by Zhou Mingzhen
Taxa named by Tom Rich